Wendi McLendon-Covey (née McLendon; born October 10, 1969) is an American actress and comedian. She is known primarily for her work in comedic and improvisational roles. Since 2013, McLendon-Covey has played the role of Beverly Goldberg, a family matriarch, on the ABC comedy series The Goldbergs, for which she was nominated for two Critics' Choice Television Awards for Best Actress in a Comedy Series.

A native of Long Beach, California, McLendon-Covey worked numerous jobs after graduating high school before earning a degree from California State University, Long Beach, in 2000. After graduating, she became a member of The Groundlings, an improvisational comedy group in Los Angeles, and remained a member until 2009. McLendon-Covey began her acting career while still a member of the Groundlings, starring as Deputy Clementine Johnson in the improvisational series Reno 911! (2003-2008, 2020–present). She also had the lead role in the Lifetime short-lived comedy Lovespring International (2006), as well as minor roles in Bewitched (2005) and Over Her Dead Body (2008). McLendon-Covey had a recurring role on the CBS sitcom Rules of Engagement (2010-2013).

After a breakout performance in the 2011 comedy film Bridesmaids, McLendon-Covey has appeared in a number of films, including What to Expect When You're Expecting (2012), The Single Moms Club (2014), Blended (2014), Think Like a Man Too (2014), Hello, My Name Is Doris (2015), Goosebumps 2: Haunted Halloween (2018), What Men Want (2019), Sylvie's Love (2020), and Barb and Star Go to Vista Del Mar (2021). In 2019, after years in comedy roles, McLendon-Covey played a leading role in the independent drama film Blush.

Early life
McLendon-Covey was born in Bellflower, California, in the family of Carolyn and Robert McLendon. She was raised Baptist, in Long Beach, California. She went to DeMille Junior High and graduated from Millikan High School. She attended Long Beach City College, Golden West College, and California State University, Long Beach, where she graduated with a B.A. in liberal studies and creative writing.

While McLendon-Covey was working at a hotel in Anaheim and after graduating from college, she enrolled in a weekend class for non-actors at The Groundlings, an improvisational group in Los Angeles. She officially joined The Groundlings in 2002, and meanwhile worked as an editor for California State University's academic journal of social work, a job she kept until 2012.

Career

2001–2010
While a member of the Groundlings, McLendon-Covey was a classmate of comedians Kaitlin Olson, Melissa McCarthy and Kristen Wiig, the latter two of whom she later starred alongside in the film Bridesmaids. While a member of the Groundlings, McLendon-Covey steadily auditioned for television and film roles, but did not have an agent at the time and was unable to book jobs.

In 2003, she  auditioned for the role of Deputy Clementine Johnson in the comedy series Reno 911! "I went in, and I thought, "Fuck this. I'm not gonna get it, but you know what? I'm just gonna go in [and try]," she recalled. At the time, the series had previously been considered by Fox. McLendon-Covey was cast in the role, and the series was subsequently picked up by Comedy Central.

In the third year of Reno 911!, she also starred in the Lifetime comedy show Lovespring International in 2006 and has provided commentary for E!, TV Guide Channel, and VH1. In 2007, she starred in the comedy film Reno 911!: Miami, based on Comedy Central's Reno 911! and also appeared in Bewitched (2005) and Over Her Dead Body (2008). She produced, wrote, and starred in the 2007 independent comedy film Cook Off!. McLendon-Covey also guest-starred on television series such as The Office, 10 Things I Hate About You, and Cougar Town.

2011–present
In 2011, McLendon-Covey starred in the financially successful and critically lauded comedy film Bridesmaids with Kristen Wiig, Maya Rudolph, Rose Byrne, Melissa McCarthy, and Ellie Kemper. Beginning in July that same year, she began starring in national TV ads for a new campaign by Hillshire Farm. From 2010 to 2013, she had a recurring role on the CBS sitcom Rules of Engagement. She also had guest-starring roles in Fox's short-lived sitcom I Hate My Teenage Daughter, TV Land's Hot in Cleveland, and ABC's Modern Family.

McLendon-Covey appeared in the 2012 romantic comedy What to Expect When You're Expecting, directed by Kirk Jones, and Steven Soderbergh's film Magic Mike. She had roles in the Christmas comedy movie A White Trash Christmas about a mom visited by three ghosts intent on showing her a path to a brighter future, and in the comedy-drama film The Breakup Girl directed by Academy Award-nominated and Emmy-winning Stacy Sherman about three estranged sisters dealing with the death of their father.

In February 2012, McLendon-Covey was cast in the HBO comedy pilot The Viagra Diaries, created by Sex and the City creator and executive producer Darren Star, but when Goldie Hawn exited the pilot, McLendon-Covey also left the show. After she received five offers, she won the female lead role on ABC's comedy pilot Only Fools And Horses. She also played one of the leads in Tyler Perry's film The Single Moms Club (2014). Also in 2014, she starred in A Merry Friggin' Christmas as Robin Williams' character's daughter, Blended, as Drew Barrymore's character's best friend, and Think Like a Man Too.

In January 2013, McLendon-Covey was cast in the lead role of the ABC comedy series The Goldbergs, created by Adam F. Goldberg. Her portrayal of the character received critical praise, and she was nominated for a Critics' Choice Television Award for Best Actress in a Comedy Series in 2014.

In 2015, McLendon-Covey starred opposite Sally Field in the comedy-drama film Hello, My Name Is Doris. Also that year, McLendon-Covey hosted ABC reality comedy series Repeat After Me, produced by Ellen DeGeneres. Also in 2015, she played the female leading role opposite Nicolas Cage in the comedy film Army of One, directed by Larry Charles.

McLendon-Covey had a dramatic role as Mark Felt's secretary Carol Tschudy in the political thriller film Mark Felt: The Man Who Brought Down the White House (2017), directed by Peter Landesman. She later played a leading role in the independent drama film Blush that premiered at the 2019 Sundance Film Festival. She starred in the 2018 horror comedy Goosebumps 2: Haunted Halloween and co-starred opposite Taraji P. Henson in the 2019 romantic comedy What Men Want. Since 2018, she has played the voice role of Nancy Green in the Disney Channel animated series Big City Greens. In 2020, she continued appearing in a dramatic roles co-starring opposite Tessa Thompson in Sylvie's Love. In 2020, McLendon-Covey reunited with Bridesmaids co-stars Kristen Wiig and Annie Mumolo in the comedy film Barb and Star Go to Vista Del Mar.

In April 2020 during the global COVID-19 pandemic shutdown, McLendon-Covey started the pop culture podcast Generation Ripe with fashion art director and producer Dfernando Zaremba, which they co-host together.  The podcast's audience is teenagers over 40 and features interviews with guests from all realms of the entertainment industry and the arts. She co-starred with Owen Wilson in the upcoming comedy film Paint.

In 2020, McLendon-Covey returned for the seventh season of Reno 911! which was aired on Quibi. In 2021, the movie Reno 911! The Hunt for QAnon was released on Paramount+. The eighth season of the series, now titled Reno 911!: Defunded, premiered on The Roku Channel in February 2022.

Personal life
McLendon-Covey has been married to Greg Covey since 1996

Filmography

Film

Television

References

External links

 
 
 
 

1969 births
21st-century American actresses
21st-century American comedians
Actresses from California
Academic journal editors
American film actresses
American television actresses
American voice actresses
American women comedians
American people of English descent
American people of Scottish descent
California State University, Long Beach alumni
Golden West College alumni
Living people
Long Beach City College alumni
People from Bellflower, California
People from Long Beach, California
Comedians from Los Angeles County
20th-century American actresses